Raymond Allen may refer to:

Raymond Allen (television actor) (1929–2020), best known for his recurring roles on Good Times and Sanford and Son
Raymond Allen (stage actor) (1921–1994), who appeared in light opera from the 1950s through the 1980s
Raymond Allen (scriptwriter) (1940–2022), who wrote the 1970s BBC comedy series Some Mothers Do 'Ave 'Em
Raymond B. Allen (1902–1986), American educator

See also
Ray Allen (disambiguation)